Cabiate - Parco della Brughiera railway station is a railway station in Italy. Located on the Milan–Asso railway, it serves the town of Cabiate and it also represents the principal entrance to the Parco della Brughiera, a wood from Cabiate to Montorfano. Here there's also an interchange with the C80 autobus line Monza-Meda-Cantù.

Services
Cabiate is served by the line S2 of the Milan suburban railway network, and by the regional line Milan–Asso. Both of them are operated by the lombard railway company Trenord.

See also
 Milan-Asso railway
 Milan suburban railway network
 Cabiate

External links
 
 Ferrovienord official site - Cabiate railway station 

Railway stations in Lombardy
Ferrovienord stations
Railway stations opened in 1879
Milan S Lines stations